You Can't Get Away with Murder is a 1939 crime drama directed by Lewis Seiler, starring Humphrey Bogart and Gale Page, and featuring  "Dead End Kid" leader Billy Halop. The film is from Bogart's period of being cast in B pictures by Warner Bros., before his breakthrough as a leading man in High Sierra two years later. The film is based on the play "Chalked Out" by Lewis E. Lawes.

Plot
In New York's Hell's Kitchen, young Johnny Stone goes against the advice of his sister Madge and hooks up with mobster Frank Wilson.

First, Johnny and Frank steal a car, and then hold up a gas station. Later, Johnny takes a gun belonging to Madge's fiancé Fred Burke and lends it to Frank to use in a pawnshop robbery. This time the owner resists and sounds an alarm; Frank kills him and leaves the gun there, so Johnny cannot return it to Fred's room as he intended. After finding his gun at the scene, the authorities do not believe Fred's alibi and he is arrested and convicted of murder. Meanwhile, based on fingerprint evidence, Frank and Johnny are arrested and convicted of the gas station robbery. All three men are sent to Sing Sing.

Johnny is not a hardened criminal like Frank, and is tortured by the thought that Fred is facing execution for their crime. But Frank repeatedly reminds Johnny that he must continue "playing dumb", as both of them face execution if either confesses. The prison authorities are suspicious of their attitude to each other and transfer Johnny from working in the prison shoe factory alongside Frank to the prison library run by a mild-mannered older convict known as Pop.

Johnny expects Fred to be cleared on appeal, not knowing that Frank also planted stolen property as evidence against him. When the appeal is denied, Johnny's pangs of conscience increase. By now Madge is convinced that Johnny knows the true killer and begs him to talk, still not suspecting Johnny's own involvement. Pop also appeals to Johnny's conscience. Fred's lawyer, Carey, eventually deduces that Johnny took Fred's gun and was responsible for its presence at the murder, but without evidence the district attorney will not request a stay of Fred's execution. Through all this, Johnny continues to "play dumb".

On the day set for Fred's execution, Frank and Johnny join in a jailbreak. In that situation Johnny is finally willing to tell the truth. He produces a written confession that he stole the gun and Frank did the shooting, leaving it for Pop to find after the breakout. But Frank sees him drop the paper and takes it instead. He decides to kill Johnny after the jailbreak.

But the jailbreak fails, ending with Frank and Johnny in a railroad boxcar surrounded by prison guards. Frank has a gun and starts shooting at the guards from concealment. When they return fire, Frank shoots Johnny and puts the gun next to him, then gives himself up, claiming that he was unarmed.

Although mortally wounded, Johnny survives long enough to tell the truth, implicating Frank for both murders and finally clearing Fred.

Cast

Home media
The film was released on DVD by Warner Archive on February 23, 2012.

In popular culture
In the 1939 film Invisible Stripes, the George Raft character (Cliff Taylor) is waiting outside a movie theater. As he paces back and forth, he passes an advertising placard for the movie You Can't Get Away With Murder which is currently playing in the theater.  When he reaches the turn around point, out walks Humphrey Bogart in his "Stripes" character of Charles "Chuck" Martin with a female companion.  The characters of Taylor and Martin have a brief conversation before Martin, with his companion, walk away and the scene changes.

References

External links
 
 
 

1939 crime drama films
1930s prison films
1939 films
American black-and-white films
American crime drama films
American films based on plays
American prison drama films
Films directed by Lewis Seiler
Films produced by Hal B. Wallis
Films produced by Samuel Bischoff
Films scored by Heinz Roemheld
Films set in New York (state)
Warner Bros. films
1930s English-language films
1930s American films